Shirley Anne Tate (born March 1956) is a Jamaican sociologist, scholar, researcher, educator, and author. She is known for her work in studying racism, the Black diaspora and the intersection with feminism; specifically within institutional racism, mixed race studies, and Black identity.

Tate holds the Canada Research Chair (CRC) in Feminism and Intersectionality in the Sociology Department of the University of Alberta, starting in 2019. She has additionally taught at Leeds Beckett University, from 2017 to 2019; and at University of Leeds, from 2012 to 2017.

Biography 
Tate was born in March 1956 in Spanish Town and raised in Sligoville, Saint Catherine Parish, Jamaica. She received a PhD in sociology from Lancaster University in 2000; and had studied at University of York where she received a M.A. degree in linguistics and M.Phil. degree in communication studies.

Tate is a Honorary Professor, chair in Critical Studies in Higher Education Transformation at Nelson Mandela University.

Publications 
This list is of select publications by Tate.

Articles

Books

References

External links 
 Shirley Tate profile at the University of Alberta

1956 births
Alumni of the University of York
Alumni of Lancaster University
Academic staff of the University of Alberta
Academics of Leeds Beckett University
Academics of the University of Leeds
People from Spanish Town
Living people
Jamaican emigrants to Canada
African diaspora studies scholars